Hieracium prolatatum is a species of flowering plant belonging to the family Asteraceae. It is found in Sweden and northwestern and northern Russia.

References

prolatatum
Flora of Sweden
Flora of North European Russia
Flora of Northwest European Russia
Plants described in 1897